Roy Malcolm Syversson (born 9 April 1940) is a retired Swedish race walker. He placed 8th in the 50 km event at the 1963 World Cup and 24th at the 1964 Summer Olympics.

References

1940 births
Living people
Athletes (track and field) at the 1964 Summer Olympics
Olympic athletes of Sweden
Swedish male racewalkers